Heilig may refer to:

Heilig-Geist-Gymnasium, several schools
Heilig (surname)
Morton Heilig (1926–1997), American cinematographer and innovator of Virtual Reality (VR) cinematography
 "Heilig" (E Nomine song), 2007
"Heilig" (Tokio Hotel song), 2008